Espedal is a place in Fjaler, Norway.

Espedal may also refer to:
Espedal Øvre, a village in Forsand, Norway

People with the surname
Ronny Espedal, Norwegian footballer
Kristian Espedal or Gaahl, Norwegian black metal vocalist
Alf Espedal, SOE agent